Axel Dreher (born September 17, 1972) is a German economist.

He earned a master's degree from the University of Mannheim in 1999, and a Ph.D. in 2003. He is among the 500 top economists of the world according to the IDEAS/RePEc. 

As professor of economics at the University of Göttingen and assistant professor at the universities of Mannheim, Exeter, Konstanz and ETH Zurich he has worked in fields including:
 the Public-Choice-Analysis of International Organizations, especially International Monetary Fund and World Bank
Economic Development, especially globalization
Public Economics, especially corruption and Shadow Economy
Public Finance
Dreher is professor of international and development politics at the Ruprecht-Karl University of Heidelberg. He is responsible for the KOF Index of Globalization at ETH in Zürich and is editor-in-chief of the Review of International Organizations.

References

External links
 Google Scholar
 IDEAS/RePEc

1972 births
Living people
University of Mannheim alumni
Academic staff of Heidelberg University
Academic staff of the University of Göttingen
German economists